Bodružal (spelled Bodružaľ; 1927–1973) is a municipality (village) in Slovakia in the Svidník District in Prešov Region, within the Laborec Highlands.

The village, first mentioned in writing in 1600, is best known for housing a baroque wooden church being a national cultural monument in Slovakia.

Genealogical resources
The records for genealogical research are available at the state archive "Statny Archiv in Presov, Slovakia"
 Greek Catholic church records (births/marriages/deaths): 1823-1922 (parish A)

Saint Nicholas Church (Bodružal)
St. Nicholas Church is a wooden Greek Catholic Church of the Eastern Rite situated in a village Bodružal in Svidník district in the Prešov Region.  It is registered on the UNESCO's World Heritage List under an identification number 1273-007 since 8 July 2008.

The church is part of a unique urban entity situated on an elevated place in the village centre. Apart from the church hall, there's a separate bell tower, an adjacent cemetery and a wooden enclosure with a shingle roof and an entrance gate covered by a conical and an onion shape roof.

The church itself is a prototype church of the so-called Lemko type. It dates back to 1658 and belongs to the oldest wooden sacral buildings of the Eastern Rites in Slovakia.

The church has three towers. The construction is made out of logs, in a shape of three squares arranged on the same axis oriented from east to west. The exterior is decorated with vertically laid planks. The logs were also used on the construction of imitation tiered corbelled arches (of a truncated pyramid) in the sanctum and the nave. The arrangement of individual parts of the church represents the Holy Trinity. The church is situated on the highest hillock of the village. With its location it is higher than the rest of the buildings and houses.

The roof is made out of shingles. The tent roof above the presbytery and the nave is finished with a short square structure, to which conical bodies are attached to. To them baroque onion-like little roofs are fixed, finished with small shingle conical heads set with wrought iron crosses.

See also
 List of municipalities and towns in Slovakia

References

External links
 
Surnames of living people in Bodruzal

Villages and municipalities in Svidník District
Šariš